The Province of Brindisi is a province in the Apulia region of Italy. Its capital is the city of Brindisi.

Geography
It was established in 1927 from the ancient Terra d'Otranto. With the Adriatic Sea to the east, it is bordered to the north by the Province of Bari, on the west by the Province of Taranto and to the south-east by the Province of Lecce. The northern, central and western parts are hilly with much woodland, with the Murgia hills of particular note, while to the north-west, bordering on the provinces of Taranto and Bari, it is lower-lying, with the Itria Valley (Valle d'Itria). The other peaks are slightly lower and are all located in the north-central area. To the south it is essentially flat and widely used for crops.

The province, according to the Geological Map of Italy, prepared by the Geological Survey of Italy, is composed of various types of land: in the central-southern area there is a predominance of dolomitic limestone (present generally in the inhabited zone from the plateau of the Murgia), small eluvial deposits, sand, clay, grey silted marshes (around Francavilla Fontana, Oria and San Donaci), chalk and limestone, including firm bioclastic limestone and chalky sandstone.
In the north-central part, particularly Bari and Mola, the limestone stems from the Late Cretaceous, and deposits of limestone and sandstone date back to the Pleistocene. There are no significant rivers, because of the karst terrain, but there are many springs that gush out producing little streams. As for waterways, the longest is the Canale Reale, which flows into the territory of Villa Castelli, bordering Francavilla Fontana, and flows into the Natural Reserve of Torre Guaceto. Along the coast, in addition, there are numerous ponds and small freshwater lakes, fed by underground aquifers.

Demography
In 1861, the province had a total population of 114,790 which grew steadily until 2001 when there were 402,422 inhabitants. It has been more or less static since 2002 when there were 401,534 inhabitants, rising to 403,163 in 2010 but falling again to 401,867 in 2011. In 2010, only 7,437 foreigners (1.8% of the total) resided in the province.

Main communes 

There are 20 comunes (Italian: comuni) in the province:

Economy
Surrounded by vineyards, artichoke and olive groves, the city of Brindisi is a major sailing port for the southern part of Italy. In modern times, the province has experienced a process of change in its economic structure, with a progressive decrease in the weight of industry and growth of the tertiary sector. A significant increase in tourism, due to a good infrastructure has been witnessed, as well as the growth of its artistic and culinary assets.

In 2011, the principal sectors of activity in the province were commerce (30%), agriculture (27%) and construction (13%), together representing 70% of the economy. The number of enterprises rose to a peak of 38,435 in 2005 but thereafter fell to 37,304 in 2011. Of these, 8,453 were active in agriculture, mainly in crop production with small percentages in the areas of livestock, agricultural support and mixed farming.

Tourism
From the beginning of the 80s to the end of the 90s the Port of Brindisi was the starting point for tourists who passed from Italy to Greece. Subsequently, the tourist demand became increasingly strong also in the rest of the province of Brindisi.
Among the best Brindisi beaches there are: Torre Guaceto and the whole area of Ostuni beaches.
Ostuni, remains in 2021 one of the main tourist attractions in the province of Brindisi. Which thanks to its characteristic beauty, especially the historic center, is called the "white city.  The beaches of Ostuni have received the FEE Blue Flag for about 10 years thanks to the quality of their waters.

Main sights
In addition to Brindisi, Oria, with its 13th century castle built by Frederick II, is one of the province's main attractions. Ostuni, still protected by its town walls, is noted for its citadel, its cathedral and numerous mansions.

References

External links

Official website
 en Brindisi
 it Altosalento Riviera dei Trulli

 
Brindisi